is Becky's second single as "Becky♪♯", released on February 3, 2010. It was included on her first album Kokoro no Hoshi.

Track listing

Charts

Oricon Sales Charts

Billboard Japan Sales Charts

Physical Sales Charts

References

External links
 

2010 singles
Becky (television personality) songs
2010 songs
EMI Music Japan singles